The 2011–12 Liga Nacional de Básquet season was the 28th season of the top professional basketball league in Argentina. The regular season started on 23 September 2011. Peñarol won their fourth title, defeating Obras Sanitarias in the finals.

Promotions and relegations
Torneo Nacional de Ascenso Champions from the previous season Quilmes and runners-up San Martín de Corrientes were promoted, occupying the berths left by El Nacional and Argentino de Junín. Quilmes and San Martín de Corrientes would be relegated at the end of the season.

Clubs

Regular season

First stage
The first stage took place between 23 September and 13 November 2011. Teams were divided into two zones. The top four teams from each zone competed in the Torneo Súper 8 that took place in November.

North Zone

South Zone

Torneo Súper 8
The eighth edition of Torneo Súper 8 took place on 23–26 November 2011 in the city of Mar del Plata, Buenos Aires. Home team Peñarol won their third title, defeating Libertad in the Final.

Second stage
The second stage started on 17 November 2011. All 16 teams were ranked together. Each team carried over half of the points obtained in the first stage.

Playoffs

Championship playoffs
The Playoffs started on 16 March 2012 and ended on 31 May 2012. Peñarol defeated Obras Sanitarias in the Finals.

Relegation playoffs
The relegation series began on 16 March. San Martín de Corrientes and Quilmes lost their respective series and were relegated to the Torneo Nacional de Ascenso.

Clubs in international competitions

Awards

Yearly Awards
Most Valuable Player: Juan Pedro Gutiérrez, Obras Sanitarias
Best Foreign Player:  Robert Battle, Lanús
Sixth Man of the Year: Tyler Field, Obras Sanitarias
Rookie of the Year: Alejandro Konsztadt, Obras Sanitarias
Coach of the Year: Silvio Santander, Lanús
Most Improved Player: Facundo Campazzo, Peñarol
All-Tournament Team:
 F Tony Washam, Obras Sanitarias
 F Leonardo Gutiérrez, Peñarol
 C Juan Pedro Gutiérrez, Obras Sanitarias
 G Facundo Campazzo, Peñarol
 G Joe Troy Smith, La Unión

References

Guía Oficial 2016/2017, laliganacional.com.ar. Retrieved 16 May 2017.

Liga Nacional de Básquet seasons
   
Argentina